The Choco brushfinch or Choco brush finch (Atlapetes crassus) is a species of bird in the family Passerellidae, the New World sparrows. It is found in Colombia and Ecuador.

Taxonomy and systematics

The Handbook of the Birds of the World (HBW) and the Clements taxonomy consider the choco brushfinch a subspecies of tricolored brushfinch (Atlapetes tricolor) but note that other authors have proposed it as a full species. The International Ornithological Congress (IOC) has accepted it as a full species.

Description

The adult's upper parts are olive to black and the underparts yellow with an olive wash on the flanks. The sides of the head are black with a yellow crown stripe and throat. Juveniles are dark brown above and lighter brown below with a rufous crown.

Distribution and habitat

The choco brushfinch is a year-round resident of Colombia's western Andes and western Ecuador. It inhabits open cloud forest and the undergrowth of openings in and edges of humid forest and secondary woodland. It is found primarily from  though there are scattered records from lower and higher elevations.

Behavior and ecology

Little is known about the choco brushfinch's diet. It forages alone, in pairs, or as a member of a mixed-species flock.

Little is known about the species' nesting phenology as well. Observers have reported nest-building in Colombia in November, February, and May; eggs in April; and fledglings in June and July. A reported nest was a thick cup placed near the ground; it contained one white egg with dusky spots.

Status

Though the species has a rather restricted range, the IUCN considers it a species of least concern.

References

Atlapetes